"In Trust of No One" is a single by the Finnish gothic metal band Charon from the album The Dying Daylights. The single entered the Finnish charts at number one.

Track listing 
 "In Trust of No One"
 "Death Can Dance"

Credits 
 Recorded by Juha Matinheikki at BRR Studios in February–March 2003
 Mixed by Mikko Karmila at Finnvox Studios in March 2003
 Mastered by Mika Jussila at Finnvox Studios March 2003
 Cover art by Jasse Von Hast
 Band photography by Timo Isoaho.

References 

2003 singles
Charon (band) songs